Great Valley High School is a comprehensive, college preparatory, public high school located in eastern Chester County.
It is located in East Whiteland Township, near Malvern, Pennsylvania. Located on the same campus as Great Valley Middle School at 225 North Phoenixville Pike, it is the only high school within the Great Valley School District.

This high school serves students residing in the Great Valley School District in Grades nine through twelve and enrolls roughly 1,150 to 1,175 students per year. The student to teacher ratio is approximately 14:1.

During the 2008 Democratic Party presidential primaries, then-Senator Barack Obama gave a speech in Great Valley's gymnasium.

Academics
Great Valley is consistently ranked among the top public high schools in Pennsylvania. The Washington Post ranked Great Valley High School among "America's Most Challenging High Schools", ranking 9th in the State Of Pennsylvania.

The U.S. News & World Report ranks the school 7th in the state and 613th nationally. Newsweek Magazine ranks the school at 169th in the country. The College Board listed the school on the AP® Honor Roll.

Students at Great Valley High School score in the top 1% in the state in Math and Science. In 2012, Great Valley High School was ranked #1 in the state for student performance in Science.

Athletics Program

Great Valley High School is a member of the Pennsylvania Interscholastic Athletic Association. Students are subject to guidelines and principles determined by this organization. More locally, Great Valley is a member of the Ches-Mont League and PIAA's District One region. It used to belong to the now defunct Southern Chester County League. Great Valley's largest athletic rival is the Unionville High School Longhorns. The high school offers athletics in all high school grades. In addition, it has an intramural program. The school has been to and won various state championships. The most recent girls state championship win was by the lacrosse team in 2002, 2005, and 2015. The most recent appearance was in 2006 when the boys soccer team lost in the championship game, but they did win states in 1989, 1990, and 1993. The boys tennis team appeared in the team state championships in 2008 but lost in the semifinals. The tennis team however won states in 2018 after beating Radnor High School. In 2010, the boys baseball team made their first trip to the state tournament, winning their first game before losing in the quarterfinals. The boys cross country team placed 11th (2010), 8th (2011), and 6th (2012) in the state championship meet. In 2011, the 4 × 400 m relay of Great Valley's storied track & field program came in first in the High School Boys Suburban ChesMont 4x400 event in the Penn Relays, with a time of 3:25.51

Notable events
In 1969, two students stole a corpse from the cemetery and hung it from the flag pole. Both were arrested.

President Barack Obama held a town hall meeting at Great Valley High School in the gymnasium during his 2008 election campaign. The meeting was open to the public and several students won the opportunity to sit in the meeting while the rest watched a live taping of it. Two Great Valley students were selected to sing The Star-Spangled Banner before Obama and those who attended the meeting.

Notable alumni
 Cheryl Abplanalp, Team USA handball player in 1996 Summer Olympics, inductee into Davis and Elkins College Hall of Fame
 Nasir Adderley, NFL Player (Los Angeles Chargers)
 Mikal Bridges, NBA Player (Brooklyn Nets), Two time NCAA Basketball Champion (Villanova Wildcats)
 Fritz Coleman, Long-time prime-time weather anchor on KNBC-TV, Los Angeles, CA; noted stand-up comedian and charity benefactor
 Amanda Jane Cooper, Broadway Actress: Glinda in Wicked
Joe Devlin, NFL football player
Adam McKay, Academy Award Winning Actor, Writer, Director
Jimmy McLaughlin, FC Cincinnati soccer player
Duane Milne, Former member of the Pennsylvania House of Representatives
Thom Nickels, Author, Journalist
Bryan Russell, Record Producer
Alice Sebold, Writer
Chris Young, Actor, Producer, Director

Renovation
A $36 million renovation was completed on the 1962 building in 2006. An addition was added to house the school's STEM classrooms as well as the construction of a new courtyard and lobby, with the expectation that the renovation will allow the school district to serve the Great Valley region for years to come.

References

External links
 Great Valley High School Website
 Great Valley Athletics Website

Public high schools in Pennsylvania
Educational institutions established in 1962
Schools in Chester County, Pennsylvania
1962 establishments in Pennsylvania